The 1935–36 British Home Championship was a football tournament played between the British Home Nations during the 1935–36 season. It was won by Scotland after a close contest between Scotland, Wales and England. England began the tournament the stronger team, with a 3–1 win over Ireland in Belfast while Scotland struggled to a 1–1 draw with Wales. Scotland recovered to beat Ireland in their second match whilst England dropped position after defeat by Wales. Wales and Ireland played a tough, high-scoring game which might have given Wales the title, but was ultimately won by the Irish, whilst Scotland came to London knowing that only a win would be enough to give them the trophy. In a furious attacking game the end result; 1–1, was enough to give Scotland an undisputed tournament success.  This was the first edition of the tournament in which a trophy was awarded to the winners.

Table

Results

References 

 British Home Championship 1919-20 to 1938-1939  - dates, results, tables and top scorers at RSSSF

1935–36 in English football
1935–36 in Scottish football
Brit
1936 in British sport
1935-36
1935–36 in Northern Ireland association football